Small Town Wisconsin is a 2020 American drama film written by Jason Naczek, directed by Niels Mueller and starring David Sullivan, Kristen Johnston and Bill Heck. Alexander Payne and Jinhua Yang served as executive producers of the film. The film was released in theaters in the United States on June 10, 2022, by Quiver Distribution.

Cast
 Kristen Johnston as Alicia
 Tanya Fischer as Deidra 
 David Sapiro as Stu
 David Sullivan as Wayne
 Cooper J. Friedman as Tyler
 Bill Heck as Chuck
 Braden Andersen as Matt
 David Ferrie as Tom

Release
The film premiered at the Sarajevo Film Festival in August 2020.  The film was also shown at the Milwaukee Film Festival in October 2020.

References

External links
 
 

American drama films
2020 drama films
Films directed by Niels Mueller
2020s English-language films
2020s American films